Cannabis in the Solomon Islands is illegal for the production, sale, and possession of marijuana for medicinal or recreational purposes. Offenders receive a fine of up to $100,000 or imprisonment of ten years. A 2011 survey of young people, found that 16.1% of males and 11.1% of females had ever used cannabis.

The Solomon Islands, like other island nations in the West Pacific is utilised as a staging point in the illicit drug trade, between South East Asia and Australasia. Cannabis is also illicitly cultivated in the Solomon Islands.

References

Solomon Islands
Health in the Solomon Islands
Politics of the Solomon Islands